The Christian Evangelical Church in Bolaang Mongondow is a Protestant church in North Sulawesi Indonesia.The church was established on June 28, 1950. The first chairman of the first Synod was PM Kolopita.

The church has 181 congregations and more than 210,000 members.

References

Reformed denominations in Indonesia